Gastagwirt is one of the oldest Austrian inns ("landgasthof") founded in 1380 and located in Eugendorf village, Austria.

Recently it was completely modernized and is used by tourist groups also from nearby Salzburg.

See also 
List of oldest companies

References

External links 
Homepage
Facebook page
Reviews on TripAdvisor.
Location on Google Maps

14th-century establishments in Austria
Companies established in the 14th century
Economy of Salzburg (state)
Hotels in Austria
Restaurants in Austria